The 2009–10 season was the 107th season in Bradford City A.F.C.'s history, their 95th in The Football League and 97th in the league system of English football. Their ninth-place finish in 2008–09 meant this season would be their third successive season in League Two.

This article covers the period from 1 July 2009 to 30 June 2010.

League data

League table

Results summary

Results by round

Season results

League Two

FA Cup

League Cup

JPT Trophy

Season summary
Stuart McCall resigned as manager during the season, leaving Peter Taylor to take over the team. Taylor produced good results, notably wins away to Rochdale and Rotherham United.

See also
2009–10 in English football
2009–10 Football League

References

Bradford City A.F.C. seasons
Bradford City